is a game of wits, Sokoban style mobile phone game which was published by Konami only in Japan in the i-mode platform and Yahoo! Keitai. It is the fourth game in the Konami Wai Wai series, and as it is traditional, it brings together popular characters from other Konami games.

Plot 
The prestigious academy Nihon University has contracted an enormous debt to Goemon, who can not pay this ninja funds used to help the poor. Goemon, driven by his sense of justice, decides to give a hand to the institution and sign up to work as a janitor job and use that to find the treasures hidden in the building, which will surely solve all the problems of money. Goemon is soon helped in this task by his friends from Konami World.

Characters 
 Goemon: Featuring for Ganbare Goemon. He is a heroic ninja thief. 
 Simon Belmont: Featuring for Castlevania. He is a strong slayer.
 Vic Viper: Featuring for Gradius. It is a legendary spaceship combat.
 Nyami: Featuring for Pop'n Music. She is the host of a program of pop music.
 Shiori Fujisaki: Featuring for Tokimeki Memorial. She is a sweet school student.
 Tir McDohl: Featuring for Suikoden. He is a young warrior with magical powers.

External links 
 Official site (Japanese)
 Gradius Home World
 Castlevania Realm

2006 video games
Crossover video games
Japan-exclusive video games
Wai Wai World
Mobile games
Puzzle video games
Video games developed in Japan